Robert Frost: A Life is a 2000 biography of the American poet Robert Frost written by Jay Parini. It won the Chicago Tribune Heartland Prize for best non-fiction book of the year.

 Praise 

 Publishers Weekly "There could be no better tribute for a poet so often underrated, maligned and misunderstood than this sympathetic and balanced portrayal."
 The New York Times "A pleasure to read, combining penetrating commentary on the poetry and good illustrative anecdotes. Mr. Parini has brought Frost more sharply into focus."
 Booklist "What distinguishes this biography most is not the meticulous research he conducted over more than two decades, but its focus on the internal realm where, in Frost's case, creativity and madness fought a battle royal."
 The Miami Herald "Inspired and always humanizing, Parini sympathetically illuminates the stunning contradictions embedded in Frost's personality, work, and life."
 Kirkus Reviews "For the 125th anniversary of the poets birth, here is neither hagiography nor pathography. Parini's life magnificently details how Frost, through fortitude and lifelong dedication to craft, sought to heed his own advice to be whole again beyond confusion."

 Awards 

 Chicago Tribune Heartland Prize for best non-fiction book of the year.

References

External links
Booknotes interview with Parini on Robert Frost: A Life, September 12, 1999, C-SPAN

2000 non-fiction books
Robert Frost
Biographies about writers
Books about poets